The 1952 Cal Poly San Dimas Broncos football team represented the Cal Poly Kellogg-Voorhis Unit—now known as California State Polytechnic University, Pomona—as an independent during the 1952 college football season. Led by Don Rees in his first and only season as head coach, Cal Poly San Dimas compiled a record of 1–6. The team was outscored by its opponents 244 to 21 the season and was shut out in four of the seven games.

Schedule

References

Cal Poly San Dimas
Cal Poly Pomona Broncos football seasons
Cal Poly Pomona Broncos football